The 1996 season is the 82nd season in Palmeiras's existence, and their 82nd in Brazil's first division. The club competed in Campeonato Paulista, Copa do Brasil, Copa CONMEBOL and Campeonato Brasileiro Série A.

Summary
During January the club reinforced the squad with central back Sandro Blum from Juventude,  offensive Midfielder Djalminha from Guarani FC and left-back Júnior from Esporte Clube Vitoria. The team won the Campeonato Paulista playing the best campaign in the professional history of that competition.  Managed by Wanderley Luxemburgo and his tactical system known as "Magic Square"(4-2-2-2), the team grabbed 83 points out of 90 possible, and scoring 102 goals in 30 matches.

In Copa do Brasil the squad advanced to semifinals and defeated 1995 Copa Libertadores incumbent champions Gremio. Shockingly, the heavy-favourite club lost the 1996 Copa do Brasil Final against Cruzeiro at Parque Antartica playing without two key players: defensive Midfielder Flavio Conceicao and Forward Müller.

During summer, the club transferred out Rivaldo to Deportivo La Coruña (after the Spanish club paid $7,0 million), Amaral to Parma and Müller to São Paulo following a contract-dispute (loaned from Kashiwa Reysol 50% co-owner of contract ended on 9 June) losing offensive ground for the upcoming Campeonato Brasileiro being early eliminated by Gremio in Quarterfinals.

Rivaldo, Cafu, Marcos, Junior, Roque Júnior, and Luizao were called up to have been playing in the Brazil national football team managed by Luiz Felipe Scolari to win the 2002 FIFA World Cup Final.

Squad

Transfers

Competitions

Campeonato Paulista

First round

Matches

Second round

Matches

Final standings

Copa do Brasil

Round of 32

Eightfinals

Quarterfinals

Semifinals

Finals

Campeonato Brasileiro

Matches

Final standings

Eightfinals

1996 Copa Conmebol

Eightfinals

Statistics

Player statistics

References

External links
First Squad  
Fixtures and results  
Fixtures and results • UOL.com.br 
Fixtures • Globo.com 

1996
Brazilian football clubs 1996 season